Khalida Ateeb is a Pakistani politician who is currently serving as a member of the Senate of Pakistan from the Sindh since March 2021. She belongs to Muttahida Qaumi Movement – Pakistan.She started her political career with MQM in 1987 and served on different key positions within MQM.She is a registered lawyer and has done Masters in Political Sciences from University of Karachi.

References

Living people
Year of birth missing (living people)
Pakistani Senators 2021–2027
21st-century Pakistani women politicians
Sindhi politicians